Mézery-près-Donneloye was a municipality in the district of Yverdon of the canton of Vaud in Switzerland. On January 1, 2008 it merged with Donneloye and Gossens to form Donneloye.

References

Former municipalities of the canton of Vaud